Hoseynabad Rural District is a rural district (dehestan) in the Central District of Anar County, Kerman Province, Iran. At the 2006 census, its population was 6,394, in 1,561 families. The rural district has 25 villages.

References 

Rural Districts of Kerman Province
Anar County